"Will the Real Martian Please Stand Up?" is episode 64 of the American television anthology series The Twilight Zone. It originally aired on May 26, 1961 on CBS.

Opening narration

Plot
While investigating reports about a UFO, state troopers Dan Perry and Bill Padgett find evidence that something crashed in a frozen pond and its occupant fled to a nearby diner called the Hi-Way Cafe. Upon arriving, the troopers find a bus parked outside. Inside the diner, they find the cook Haley, bus driver Olmstead, and his passengers: dancer Ethel McConnell, outlandish old man Avery, businessman Ross, and two married couples.

The troopers announce a suspected alien may be among them and asks for everyone to identify themselves. After introducing himself, Olmstead states he was forced to stop at the diner due to the snowstorm outside. After learning the bridge ahead is closed, the troopers tell the passengers they may have to wait until morning pending an inspection by the county engineer. Olmstead states he counted six passengers on initial boarding, but the troopers point out seven in the diner. Haley claims the diner was empty before the bus.

Following initial debate, Ethel suggests the couples should be cleared of suspicion as the spouses know each other. Both couples readily agree, but begin suspecting each other. When asked for her ID, Ethel claims it was sent ahead with her luggage. Despite this, Olmstead vouches for her, admitting he did notice her. As Avery jokes and Ross complains about not being able to make an important meeting, tensions rise after the jukebox flashes and the tabletop sugar dispensers explode. The troopers then receive a phone call telling them the bridge is safe to cross. Olmstead is concerned about its instability, but the troopers assuage his fears and everyone leaves after paying Haley.

Sometime later, Ross returns alone and explains the bridge collapsed, with no survivors other than himself. When Haley asks how Ross survived, the latter explains that everything that happened earlier, such as the jukebox and phone call, were illusions, and reveals himself as the alien by displaying three arms. He says that he is a scout sent ahead of his arriving fleet to ensure Earth is ready for Martian colonization. However, Haley reveals that he is a scout from Venus, and that his colonists have intercepted the Martian fleet, displaying a third eye on his forehead hidden by his cap.

Closing narration

See also
 List of The Twilight Zone (1959 TV series) episodes

References

DeVoe, Bill. (2008). Trivia from The Twilight Zone. Albany, GA: Bear Manor Media. 
Grams, Martin. (2008). The Twilight Zone: Unlocking the Door to a Television Classic. Churchville, MD: OTR Publishing.

External links

1961 American television episodes
Mars in television
Venus in film
The Twilight Zone (1959 TV series season 2) episodes
Television episodes written by Rod Serling